The MOS Technology "Agnus", usually called Agnus, is an integrated circuit in the custom chipset of the Amiga computer.  The Agnus, Denise and Paula chips collectively formed the OCS and ECS chipsets.

The Agnus is the Address Generator Chip.  Its main function, in chip area, is the RAM Address Generator and Register Address Encoder which handles all DMA addresses. The 8361 Agnus is made up of approximately 21000 transistors and contains DMA Channel Controllers. According to Jay Miner, original Agnus was fabricated in 5 μm manufacturing process like all OCS chipset. The Blitter and Copper are also contained here.

Agnus features:
 The Blitter, a bitmap manipulator. The Blitter is capable of copying blocks of display data, or any arbitrary data in the on-board memory, at high speed with various raster operations as well as drawing pixel perfect lines and filling outlined polygons, while freeing the CPU for concurrent tasks.
 "Copper", a display synchronized co-processor
 25 Direct Memory Access (DMA) channels, allowing graphics, sound and I/O to be used with minimal CPU intervention
 DRAM refresh controller
 Memory controller (memory that can be accessed by the processor and the chipset)
 Generates the system clock from the 28 MHz oscillator
 Video timing

Agnus was replaced by Alice in the Amiga 4000 and Amiga 1200 when the AGA chipset was introduced in 1992.

Chips by capability 

 OCS Agnus which can address up to 512 kB of Chip RAM (PLCC versions add 512 kB of pseudo-fast RAM)
 8361 (DIP) - Amiga 1000 (NTSC); Amiga 2000 model A (NTSC)
 8367 (DIP) - Amiga 1000 (PAL); Amiga 2000 model A (PAL)
 8370 (PLCC) - Amiga 500 to Rev 5.x (NTSC); Amiga 2000 model B to Rev 4.5 (NTSC)
 8371 (PLCC) - Amiga 500 to Rev 5.x (PAL); Amiga 2000 model B to Rev 4.5 (PAL)
 ECS Agnus which can address up to 1 MB of Chip RAM
 8372 - no data*
 8372A - Amiga 500 from Rev 6 (NTSC/PAL); Amiga 2000 model B from Rev 6.0 to Rev 6.3 (NTSC/PAL); Commodore CDTV
 8375 (318069-16 only) (PAL) - Amiga 500 from Rev 6 (PAL); Amiga 2000 model B from Rev 6.4 (PAL)
 8375 (318069-17 only) (NTSC) - Amiga 500 from Rev 6 (NTSC); Amiga 2000 model B from Rev 6.4 (NTSC)
 ECS Agnus which can address up to 2 MB of Chip RAM
 8372AB - Amiga 3000 from Rev 6.1 to Rev 8.9 (NTSC/PAL)
 8372B - Amiga 3000 Rev 9 (NTSC/PAL)
 8375 (PAL) - Amiga 500 Plus; Amiga 600 (PAL)
 8375 (NTSC) - Amiga 600 (NTSC)

* Somewhere 8372A Agnus mentioned as simply "8372".

Chips by package 

 48-lead DIP Agnus (aka thin Agnus): 8361; 8367
 84-contact PLCC Fat Agnus (named Fat Lady on most Amiga 2000 motherboards) 8370; 8371; 8372; 8372A; 8372AB; 8372B; 8375

NotesFat Agnus 1MB and Fat Agnus 2MB usually known as Super Agnus; Super Fat Agnus; Fatter Agnus; Big Agnus; Big Fat Agnus, but these aren't official names.

DMA Channels

Pinout

PLCC Versions 
When replacing or upgrading chips, pinouts need to be taken care of.  Types are just mentioned for reference; four-digit types and pinouts/usage are not consistent.

References: A500 Service Training, A3000 Service Manual, A500+ Service Manual, A1200 schematics

See also

References
Sources
 AMIGA 1000 ASSEMBLY LEVEL REPAIR (Commodore-Amiga, Inc.) 1985 PN 314038-01 Dave's Amiga Schematics and Manuals
 Commodore Amiga A500/A2000 Technical Reference Manual (Commodore-Amiga, Inc.) 1987 Dave's Amiga Schematics and Manuals
 A500 SYSTEM SCHEMATICS COMPONENT PART LIST (Rev 6A/7) Dave's Amiga Schematics and Manuals
 A3000 SYSTEM SCHEMATICS (Commodore Business Machines, Inc.) March, 1990 PN-314677-01 www.1000bit.net
 CDTV SERVICE MANUAL (Commodore International Spare GmbH) May, 1991 PN-400403-01 www.ianstedman.co.uk (ZIP-file)
 A500 PLUS SERVICE MANUAL (Commodore International Spare GmbH) October, 1991 PN-400420-01 www.1000bit.net
 A600 SYSTEM SCHEMATICS (Commodore International Spare GmbH) April, 1992 PN-400422-02 www.1000bit.net
 OBLIGEMENT: les chipsets de l'Amiga
 Big Book of Amiga Hardware
 alexh on English Amiga Board (Agnus 8372B info)
 National Amiga Inc. mirrored on l8r.net
 Marketed Commodore Amiga models
 AMIGA Auckland Inc.
 Amiga University
 Commodore Computer Online Museum
Notes

MOS Technology integrated circuits
Amiga